Love Without Hope is a 2007 novel by the Australian author Rodney Hall.

Dedication 
"For Julian Burnside"

Epigraph 
"You are not dying because you are ill. You are dying because you are alive." - Montaigne

Awards and nominations 

Miles Franklin Literary Award, 2008: shortlisted
Australia-Asia Literary Award, 2008: longlisted

Reviews 
The Age, theage.com.au
Australian Book Review, vicnet.net.au
The Sydney Morning Herald, smh.com.au

References 

2007 Australian novels